Knud Baade (28 March 1808  -  24 November 1879)  was a Norwegian  painter, mostly of portraits and landscapes. He was particularly known for his moonlight paintings which are characterized by strong and dramatic contrasts between light and shadow.

Biography
Knud Andreassen Baade was born in Skjold, a former municipality now in Vindafjord  in Rogaland county, Norway. He was the son of Andreas Baade (1775–1852) and Johanne Margarethe Magnus (1788–1851).
While still a boy he moved to Bergen with his family.

He began his artistic education at the age of fifteen, under the  Danish-Swedish painter, Carl Peter Lehmann (1794-1876).  In 1827 he went to Copenhagen, where he studied at the Royal Danish Academy of Fine Arts for about three years, until financial difficulties forced him to move to Christiania (now Oslo) and take up portrait-painting. When, however, his father became a magistrate in Sogn, he followed his family to  the parish of Solvorn  in Luster. The mountains, fiords and rocky bays offered ample subjects for his work. He also traveled northward to Trondheim and as far north as Bodø in search of material for his pictures.

In 1836 he was persuaded by the well-known landscape painter, J.C. Dahl  to go to Dresden, where he studied for three years. There that he  met Caspar David Friedrich and was strongly influenced by  him. He returned to Norway in 1839 due of a disease in his eyes. In 1846 he moved to Munich, where he soon earned  a reputation as a landscape painter,  producing views of his native country and the scenes around its coasts, mostly depicted with moonlight effects. Though but an invalid, he worked at Munich continually until his death there in 1879.

Baade was painter to the Court of Sweden, and a member of the Royal Swedish Academy of Arts. He painted some fine portraits, especially in younger years, including portraits of his parents (1836). In addition to several trips to Sogn and Hardanger, Baade traveled widely in Germany. He also painted landscape scenes from Bavaria, Saxony, Tyrol and Switzerland. He is represented in the National Museum of Art, Architecture and Design with 52 paintings.

Gallery

Selected works
Oslo. National Gallery. Wood at North Kyst
London. Victoria and Albert Museum.The Wreck
Munich. Pinakothek. Scene from Norse Mythology
Stockholm. Nationalmuseum. Ship by Moonlight

References

Bibliography
Knut Ljøgodt (2012)  Moonlight Romantic: Knud Baade (1808-1879)  (Oslo: Orkana Forlag)

Other Sources
 

1808 births
1879 deaths
People from Vindafjord
19th-century Norwegian painters
Royal Danish Academy of Fine Arts alumni
Norwegian male painters
Norwegian expatriates in Germany
19th-century Norwegian male artists